Yaari means "friendship" in North Indian languages such as Hindi, Urdu or Punjabi. It is also a Hebrew surname. It may refer to:

 Yaari (surname) (or "Ya'ari"), a surname typically used in Israel
 No. 1 Yaari, an Indian television and web-series
 "Yaari Hai", a 2019 song by Tony Kakkar

See also
 
 Yaar? (disambiguation)
 Yaariyan (disambiguation)